Mount Carpe is a  mountain in the Alaska Range, in Denali National Park and Preserve, on a northeast buttress of Denali. The Carpe Ridge includes Mount Tatum. Mount Carpe was named in 1943 by the U.S. Army Test Expedition after Allen Carpé, who was killed along with Theodore G. Koven (for whom Mount Koven is named), while on the Rockefeller Cosmic Ray Expedition in May 1932 when they fell into a crevasse on Muldrow Glacier.

See also
Mountain peaks of Alaska

References

Denali